Emma Lovisa Karlsson (born 24 May 1995) is a Swedish sailor. She qualified to represent Sweden in the 2020 Tokyo Summer Olympics, competing in the  women's 470 event and ranking 14th.

References

External links
 
 
 
 

1995 births
Living people
Swedish female sailors (sport)
Olympic sailors of Sweden
Sailors at the 2020 Summer Olympics – 470
Place of birth missing (living people)